The 1984 Tokyo Indoor, also known by its sponsored name Seiko Super Tennis, was a men's tennis tournament played on indoor carpet courts at the Yoyogi National Gymnasium in Tokyo, Japan that was part of the 1984 Volvo Grand Prix. It was the seventh edition of the tournament and was held from 15 October through 19 October 1984. Matches were the best of three sets. First-seeded Jimmy Connors won the singles title, his second at the event after 1980, and earned $60,000 first-prize money.

Finals

Singles

 Jimmy Connors defeated  Ivan Lendl 6–4, 3–6, 6–0
 It was Connors' 5th singles title of the year and the 105th of his career.

Doubles

 Sammy Giammalva, Jr. /  Tony Giammalva defeated  Mark Edmondson /  Sherwood Stewart 7–6, 6–4

References

External links
 ITF tournament edition details

Tokyo Indoor
Tokyo Indoor
Tokyo Indoor